Suite Punta del Este is a tango nuevo work for orchestral strings and a bandoneón written by the Argentine composer Ástor Piazzolla in 1982. Punta del Este is an Uruguayan resort where the artist spent many summers and particularly enjoyed shark fishing.

It is broken into 3 movements:

I. Introduccion: Allegro pesante

II. Coral: Adagio

III. Fuga: Allegro vivace.

Suite Punta Del Este is a scored for bandoneón, flute, oboe, clarinet, bassoon and strings.

It has been used as a signature theme for the 1995 science fiction film 12 Monkeys as well as a model for music in a scene in The Simpsons episode "Yokel Chords".

References

Tangos
Orchestral suites
Compositions by Ástor Piazzolla
1982 songs